Branislav Stankovič (born 30 May 1965) is a former professional tennis player from Slovakia.

Career
Stankovič was a gold medal winner alongside Richard Vogel in the men's doubles at the 1987 Summer Universiade, which were held in Zagreb.

He reached the second round of the Wimbledon Championships in both 1988 and 1992, with wins over Todd Nelson and Andrew Foster respectively. He was more successful in the doubles, making it into the third round at the 1989 French Open, partnering Miloslav Mečíř.

In 1992, Stanković and Karel Nováček teamed up to win the Prague Open. His next best result on tour was a semi-final appearance in the doubles of the Austrian Open two years earlier.

He appeared in the doubles rubber of five Davis Cup ties for Slovakia and won them all, four times with Ján Krošlák and the other with Karol Kučera as his partner.

ATP career finals

Doubles: 1 (1–0)

Challenger titles

Singles: (1)

Doubles: (7)

References

1965 births
Living people
Czechoslovak male tennis players
Slovak male tennis players
Universiade medalists in tennis
Sportspeople from Piešťany
Universiade gold medalists for Czechoslovakia
Medalists at the 1987 Summer Universiade